The Liceu bombing attack, in which an anarchist threw two bombs from the balcony of Barcelona's Liceu opera house, killed 20 people on November 7, 1893.

The bombing was in response to the 1893 execution of Paulí Pallàs following his assassination attempt on Catalonia Captain General Arsenio Martínez Campos. Santiago Salvador, Pallàs's friend, was arrested in January 1894. In reaction to the bombing, Valeriano Weyler was installed with the mandate of hunting anarchists and declared martial law. Hundreds of laborers were arrested and several confessed to the Liceu bombing after being tortured. Even after Salvador's arrest, laborers remained imprisoned and six were executed.

See also 

 Montjuïc trial

References

Further reading 

 
 
 
 
 

1893 in Spain
Anarchism in Spain
Terrorism in Spain
Liceu
November 1893 events